Kathrine Rolsted Harsem (born 7 February 1989) is a Norwegian cross-country skier.

She made her FIS Cross-Country World Cup debut in March 2010 in Oslo. She collected her first World Cup points with a 17th-place finish in the March 2013 in Drammen. Her first top-10 placement came in February 2014 in Toblach. She was dropped from the Norwegian National Cross-country Team in May 2019, due to poor results during the 2018–19 season, where she was not selected for the World Championships in Seefeld.

She represents the sports club IL Varden, prior to 2011 for Fossum IF.

Cross-country skiing results
All results are sourced from the International Ski Federation (FIS).

Olympic Games

World Championships

World Cup

Season standings

Individual podiums
 1 podium – (1 )

References

External links
 
 
 

1989 births
Living people
Sportspeople from Bærum
Norwegian female cross-country skiers
Cross-country skiers at the 2018 Winter Olympics
Olympic cross-country skiers of Norway
Tour de Ski skiers
21st-century Norwegian women